Kellogg, Hansen, Todd, Figel & Frederick PLLC is an American law firm based in Washington, DC. The "uber-elite, D.C.-based litigation boutique" was founded in 1993 by three former Harvard Law School classmates, Michael K. Kellogg, Peter W. Huber, and Mark C. Hansen.

The firm is "recognized for its excellence in litigation."  Nearly all of its partners and associates graduated from top-tier law schools and served as law clerks for federal judges, and more than a dozen clerked for Justices of the United States Supreme Court.  Practice areas include commercial litigation, appellate litigation, antitrust litigation, telecommunications law, and governmental investigations.  The firm won the two largest antitrust judgments in United States history (Conwood v. U.S. Tobacco and In re Urethanes Antitrust Litigation), as well as the seminal cases Bell Atlantic Corp. v. Twombly and American Express v. Italian Colors Restaurant.

Throughout its history, Kellogg Hansen has frequently represented clients in the telecommunications industry in their dealings with the Federal Communications Commission. Its clients have included AT&T and Verizon. The firm has also made a successful challenge to regulations that stemmed from the Telecommunications Act of 1996.

Notable members and alumni
Current
 David Frederick

Former
 Neil Gorsuch, Associate Justice of the United States Supreme Court
 Andy Oldham, United States circuit judge of the United States Court of Appeals for the Fifth Circuit
 Paul Matey, United States circuit judge of the United States Court of Appeals for the Third Circuit
 Julius N. Richardson, United States circuit judge of the United States Court of Appeals for the Fourth Circuit
 James E. Boasberg, United States District Judge on the United States District Court for the District of Columbia
 Jeffrey A. Meyer, United States District Judge on the United States District Court for the District of Connecticut
 Eduardo Penalver
 Dan Markel
 Courtney Simmons Elwood, former general counsel of the Central Intelligence Agency
 Peter W. Huber
 Richard H. Stern
 Howard Shelanski
 Rachel Barkow

References

External links
 Official website

Law firms established in 1993
Law firms based in Washington, D.C.